William Preston Young (4 August 1892 – 5 June 1965) was an English professional footballer who played as a goalkeeper in the Football League for Brentford. He was the first player to make 100 Football League appearances for Brentford.

Career 
A goalkeeper, Young began his career with spells at Whitburn and South Shields. Young transferred to Brentford in 1920 and played in the club's first ever Football League match on 28 August 1920, which ended in a 3–0 defeat to fellow Third Division newcomers Exeter City. Young battled for the goalkeeper's jersey with cricketer Jack Durston, but eventually made the position his own and made 94 consecutive appearances between September 1922 and October 1924. He left the club at the end of the 1924–25 season, after making 180 appearances for Brentford. Young was the club's record Football League appearance-maker until his total was overtaken by Jack Lane.

Career statistics

References

1892 births
1965 deaths
People from Whitburn, Tyne and Wear
Footballers from Tyne and Wear
English footballers
Association football goalkeepers
Brentford F.C. players
English Football League players
South Shields F.C. (1889) players